Dmitri Olegovich Tsypchenko (born 29 June 1999) is a Russian football player who plays as a centre forward for PFC Krylia Sovetov Samara.

Club career
He made his debut in the Russian Professional Football League for FC Chertanovo Moscow on 29 July 2016 in a game against FC Kaluga. He made his Russian Football National League debut for Chertanovo on 17 July 2018 in a game against FC Rotor Volgograd.

He made his Russian Premier League debut for PFC Krylia Sovetov Samara on 30 July 2021 in a game against FC Spartak Moscow.

Career statistics

References

External links
 
 
 
 Profile by Russian Professional Football League

1999 births
Footballers from Voronezh
Living people
Russian footballers
Russia youth international footballers
Association football forwards
FC Chertanovo Moscow players
PFC Krylia Sovetov Samara players
Russian Premier League players
Russian First League players
Russian Second League players